Soundplate is a London-based record label and music technology company.

Soundplate have developed a range of marketing tools and resources for music artists and record labels.

Originally founded in 2010 by Matt Benn, Soundplate started as a website covering all aspects of dance music and all genres of the global scene therein. The aim of the site was to cover all genres without prejudice, to appeal to an audience of professional DJs and dance music fans.

Although Soundplate is based in London it is a remote company with team members in several different countries.

Record Label

Soundplate Records has released music for a number of high-profile electronic music artists including Bakermat, Opia, Uppermost, Andrew Applepie and an official remix of album of the late Nina Simone.

To date (May 2018), Soundplate Records have released more than 50 titles (including compilations and releases on the sub-label SP NXT).

Soundplate Records is independent and currently distributed worldwide by Believe Digital.

Website & Tools for Music Artists

Soundplate has a focus on helping artists. Their unique tools help artists reach playlist curators and better market their music.

Tools Soundplate have developed for artists include:

Aside from that, Soundplate publishes a large amounts of unique music content including reviews, interviews with global talent such as 
Little Louie Vega, DJ EZ and many more and also films and edits video exclusives such as interviews, event videos and live DJ sets from DJ Kayper, Tramlines Festival and Guy Gerber

Previous Soundplate Projects 
In the past, Soundplate has hosted and streamed a dance music industry debate (July 2013) 'The Soundplate Great Vinyl Debate', an awards ceremony.
and previously provided a weekly chart for Ministry of Sound Radio

Soundplate Events

The first official Soundplate event was held inside the world-famous Ministry of Sound in 2012. The Soundplate Awards 2013 were held at Basing House 
The events have featured in publications including Timeout Magazine, Urban Nerds  and All In London 
Soundplate have also hosted parties in other areas of the UK and Europe.

On July 7, 2013 Soundplate hosted a live debate at Google Campus in London about the future of vinyl. 
The panel was chaired by Clive Morgan from The Telegraph and included James Lavelle, Sonny Wharton, Uncle Dugs and DJ Magazine.

The Soundplate x Ministry of Sound Radio Chart (Weekly)

From 2011-2013 Soundplate provided a weekly chart for Ministry of Sound radio which was hosted by Ricky Simmonds as part of his House and Funky show.

References

British music websites